Kameshwar Paswan (1941-2018)  was a politician from Bihar state of India and was a leader of Bharatiya Janata Party. He was a former state minister and a former member of Rajya Sabha and Lok Sabha. He was elected to Bihar Legislative Assembly first time in 1972 as a candidate of Bharatiya Jan Sangh . Later in 1977 he was again elected to the assembly and served as minister for welfare in Government of Bihar until 1979. Paswan got elected to Rajya Sabha in 1990 and served as its member until 1996. In the same year he was elected to Lok Sabha from Nawada.

He  studied MA from Ramdayalu Singh College and Langat Singh College in Muzaffarpur. He was a teacher by profession.

Paswan took part in Bihar movement launched by Jayaprakash Narayan and was arrested by then Congress government in the emergency in 1976 and kept in jail for 19 months.

References

Bharatiya Janata Party politicians from Bihar
India MPs 1996–1997
Lok Sabha members from Bihar
Rajya Sabha members from Bihar
Indians imprisoned during the Emergency (India)
Living people
1941 births
People from Patna district
Bihar MLAs 1972–1977
Bihar MLAs 1977–1980